Jan Louise Hall (born 21 November 1958) is a New Zealand former cricketer who played primarily as a right-arm medium bowler. She appeared in 11 One Day Internationals for International XI at the 1982 World Cup. She played domestic cricket for Otago and Southern Districts.

References

External links
 
 

Living people
1958 births
People from Mosgiel
New Zealand women cricketers
International XI women One Day International cricketers
Otago Sparks cricketers
Southern Districts women cricketers